</noinclude>

The Swiss sovereign money initiative of June 2018, also known as Vollgeld, was a citizens' (popular) initiative in Switzerland intended to give the Swiss National Bank the sole authority to create money.

On 10 June 2018, the initiative was defeated in the vote, with 76% percent of voters rejecting it.

Origin and proposal
Proposals for "full-reserve banking", going also by titles such as "debt-free money," have been repeatedly presented to the public and then attacked by both mainstream and heterodox economists who suggest that supporters of such "populist" schemes misunderstand central-bank operations, money creation, and how the banking system works. Russian-born British economist Abba Lerner, in 1943, had advocated that the central bank could start "printing money" to match government deficit-spending "sufficient to achieve and sustain full employment."

According to the initiative's supporters, money is created as debt, and comes into existence by debt creation when commercial banks borrow from central banks, and when governments, producers, or consumers borrow from commercial banks. Proponents do not want money creation to be under private control as this constitutes a "subsidy" to the banking sector. They consider money created by the banks to create significantly adverse effects, such as inflation (since "the more money [the banks] issue, the higher their profits"), and amplification of crises (since borrowing occurs pro-cyclically). Furthermore, they claim that bank deposits are not inherently safe.

The proposal for the referendum was initiated in 2014 by the Monetary Modernisation Association, a Swiss non-governmental organization founded in 2011. The collection of signatures began in June 2014 and resulted in over 110,000 valid signatures. The initiative was submitted to the Federal Chancellery in December 2015.

On 31 January 2018, the Swiss state scheduled the referendum for 10 June 2018, with two issues on the ballot, one about gambling, and another about money creation by banks.
The Sovereign Money Initiative aims to give the Swiss Confederation a monopoly on money creation, including demand deposit (full-reserve banking), by including the creation of scriptural money in the legal mandate of the Swiss National Bank. The Swiss National Bank opposed the referendum.

The referendum does not concern the printing of banknotes or the minting of coins, as this remains under the exclusive authority of the Swiss National Bank, i.e. the nation's central bank, which has had this right since 1891. The Federal Constitution states that "The Confederation [i.e. the Swiss state] is responsible for money and currency; the Confederation has the exclusive right to issue coins and banknotes" (article 99). Thus, the creation of cash, today less than 10% of all the money in circulation, remain under the control of the central bank.

Reactions to the proposal
The Swiss National Bank chairman, Thomas Jordan, warned that "Acceptance of the initiative would plunge the Swiss economy into a period of extreme uncertainty" because "Switzerland would have an untested financial system that would differ fundamentally from that of any other country". The Deutsche Bundesbank does not support the initiative.

In 2016, The Economist commented that the Sovereign Money Initiative "system would be safer for depositors" but that "a huge part of the Swiss economy, would be turned inside-out, with unpredictable but probably expensive consequences." Global Finance described the Sovereign Money Initiative as "challenging the current worldwide norm".

In June 2018, Financial Times associate editor and chief economics commentator Martin Wolf urged his readers to vote in favour of the Swiss initiative, stating that existing bank regulation and bank balance sheets would not be sufficient to prevent a major future crisis. Economist L. Randall Wray has argued repeatedly on what he sees as the "foolishness" of policy proposals like the Vollgeld initiative. Writer and blogger Tim Worstall believed the initiative itself is ostensibly "driven by ill-informed loons."

The Icelandic proposal, with exactly the same as the Swiss initiative, cited "the [private] banks' ability to create credit" as the reason that Iceland's banking system went overboard. Critics responded, this is not the case at all. The Central Bank of Iceland must provide banks with reserves as needed so that the central bank does not lose control of interest rates and a liquidity crisis between banks is not triggered. The Central Bank of Iceland, critics of the proposal state, had to create and provide new central-bank reserves to accommodate banks as the banks expanded the money supply nineteenfold between 1994 and 2008. They claim that central banks do not and cannot control the money supply, contrary to what Monetarists claim. The money supply would still be endogenous under the Icelandic scheme unless the central bank of the country would be "willing to tolerate the interest rate going beyond its control" or for the economy to lack funds for borrowing. Iceland's banks, they state, failed for other reasons, which were detailed in the special report commissioned by the Icelandic parliament, they state, such as the rapid growth of the banks, the deterioration of the quality of their portfolio, the fact that foreign deposits and short-term, securitized funding became the main source of funding for the three banks; and the prudential regulator was inexperienced and understaffed given the massive foreign exposure of the banking system.

Result
On 10 June 2018, the Swiss rejected in a "landslide" of approximately 75% of negative votes the proposal of the sovereign-money project.

Historical precedents

The objective of the Swiss sovereign money initiative of June 2018 was essentially to "end fractional reserve banking." The specific initiative in Switzerland was part of the so-called "International Movement for Monetary Reform," created by the lobbying organisation Positive Money in 2013. The idea of requiring banks’ loans to be fully backed by deposits, according to them,  has its roots in the Great Depression.

Opposition to fractional-reserve banking has been prominent for over a century. The genesis of the Swiss initiative can be traced back to the so-called "Chicago plan" of reforms after the Great Depression. In March 1933, economists from the University of Chicago circulated a six-page memorandum with a proposal to "radically" change the structure of the American financial system. They proposed, among other things, the abolition of the fractional reserve system and the imposition of 100% bank reserves on demand deposits. The proposal in Switzerland to reform the ability of private banks to create money is based on a theory of American economist Irving Fisher from the 1930s.
	
The proposal resurfaced in 1939 and came to be known as the "Chicago plan."

The Vollgeld initiative's monetary reform ideas had already been the subject of a federal legislation proposal in the United States through U.S. Congressman Dennis Kucinich. In 2011, Positive Money and the American Monetary Institute backed  Kucinich's attempt to introduce the National Emergency Employment Defense Act, a bill of legislation that would assign the authority for money creation exclusively to the U.S. Treasury, thus ending fractional banking. The proposal did not make it to the floor.

In 2015, following the 2008-11 crisis, Iceland's Prime Minister Sigmundur Davíð Gunnlaugsson commissioned a study for monetary and banking reform. Frosti Sigurjónsson, economist and MP, published his findings and recommendations the same year, in which the abolition of fractional banking, among other things, was proposed. Economist Bill Mitchell criticized the Icelandic scheme, on the grounds that, as he stated, even if implemented, "essentially the money supply would still be endogenous," unless the country's central bank would be willing to "tolerate the interest rate going beyond its control" or witness "a lack of funds available for borrowing." Mitchell argued that the cause of the crisis in Iceland was not the "credit-creation capacity of the banks" but other factors, such as "banks speculating in foreign-currency debt & assets"; banks "no longer behaving like banks"; the owners of the specific banks "engaging in devious and self-serving" actions; and "lack of prudential control."

The same year, the  “Ons Geld” ("Our Money") organization that supports "sovereign monetary reform" in the Netherlands mounted a citizen's initiative that resulted in parliamentary debate and the decision to have the government think tank  Scientific Council for Government Policy study the proposal to have fractional banking outlawed and “money creation returned to public hands”.

See also 

 The Chicago Plan Revisited
 Monetary reform
 Money creation
 Politics of Switzerland
 Swiss gold reserves referendum, 2014

Notes

References

2018 referendums
sovereign-money initiative
Sovereign money
Monetary reform
Monetary policy
Economy of Switzerland
June 2018 events in Switzerland